Protopopivka is a village in Ukraine, in Odesa Raion of Odesa Oblast. The village has a population of 408 people. It belongs to Usatove rural hromada, one of the hromadas of Ukraine. Protopopivka is one of 15 villages in the Usatove (hromada). It is one of the villages established during the Constituency 139.

Until 18 July 2020, Protopopivka belonged to Biliaivka Raion. The raion was abolished in July 2020 as part of the administrative reform of Ukraine, which reduced the number of raions of Odesa Oblast to seven. The area of Biliaivka Raion was merged into Odesa Raion.

Population census 
As of 18 January 1989, Protopopivka had a population of 440 with 214 men, and 226 women. As of 5 December 2001, Protopopivka has a total population of 425.

Language distribution 
It shows the language distribution. It only have 2 languages, Ukrainian and Russian.

References 

Villages in Odesa Raion
Usatove Hromada